Claude Abadie (16 January 1920 – 29 March 2020) was a French jazz clarinetist and bandleader.

Abadie was born in January 1920 in Paris. He was interested in New Orleans jazz and Chicago jazz from an early age, and formed his own ensemble in 1941 to play in a Dixieland-revival style; Boris Vian played in the group from 1943. Soon after, Abadie's ensemble included Claude Luter, Jef Gilson, Raymond Fol, and Hubert Fol. He founded a new ensemble in 1949, which included Jean-Claude Fohrenbach and Benny Vasseur, but quit music in 1952, not returning to performance until 1963. In 1965 he formed a large ensemble to play contemporary jazz; among his sidemen was Paul Vernon.

He turned 100 in January 2020 and died that March.

References

Michel Laplace, "Claude Abadie". The New Grove Dictionary of Jazz. 2nd edition, ed. Barry Kernfeld.

1920 births
2020 deaths
French centenarians
French jazz clarinetists
Men centenarians
Musicians from Paris